Stuckey House is a historic home located near Jones Springs, Berkeley County, West Virginia. It was built in the 1820s, and is a two-story, three-bay, central block of cut limestone, with a -story rubble limestone, three-bay wing.  The house dates to the Federal period and has a steeply sloped gable roof.  Also on the property is a limestone springhouse, log smoke house, and "necessary".

It was listed on the National Register of Historic Places in 1991.

References

Houses on the National Register of Historic Places in West Virginia
Federal architecture in West Virginia
Houses completed in 1820
Houses in Berkeley County, West Virginia
National Register of Historic Places in Berkeley County, West Virginia